National Highway 143B, commonly referred to as NH 143B is a national highway in India. It is a secondary route of National Highway 43. NH-143B runs in the states of Chhattisgarh and Jharkhand in India.

Route 
NH143B connects Jashpur Nagar, Jagannathpur, Gobindpur, Dumri and Mahuadanr in the states of Chhattisgarh and Jharkhand.

Junctions  

  Terminal near Jashpur Nagar.

See also 
 List of National Highways in India
 List of National Highways in India by state

References

External links 

National highways in India
National Highways in Jharkhand
National Highways in Chhattisgarh